Asociación Pro Derechos Humanos (APRODEH) is a Peruvian human rights organization. It was established in 1983 by a group of professionals who had been providing information to Peruvian congressmen involved with the Congressional Human Rights Commission, such as Javier Diez Canseco. The group supported  legislative work in view of the growing human rights violations during the internal conflict in Peru.

In 1985, APRODEH was among the founding members of the Coordinadora Nacional de Derechos Humanos del Perú. 

APRODEH works with many organizations both within and outside of Peru.

The current directors of the group are Francisco Soberón and Miguel Jugo.

External links
APRODEH's official website
Article on and interview with Francisco Soberón

Human rights organisations based in Peru
Internal conflict in Peru
Organisations based in Lima